Mohanrao Shankarrao Kallianpurkar (12 August 1913 – 1 December 1985) was a Kathak dancer and teacher from Karnataka, considered to be one of the greatest scholars and teacher of Kathak dance form. He belongs to Jaipur school of Kathak.

Biography
Kallianpurkar was born on 12 August 1913 in Bangalore, Karnataka.

He was trained under Sunder Prasad, Achhan Maharaj, and Shambhu Maharaj. He helped Sunder Prasad to set up a Kathak dance academy in Mumbai in 1937. In 1939, he was appointed as a Kathak teacher at the Marris College of Music, later Bhatkhande Music Institute, in Lucknow, from where he retired in 1967. He choreographed and presented ballets such as Śakuntalā, Meghadoot, War and Peace, Vikramōrvaśīyam and Mālati Mādhav. His prominent pupils included Rohini Bhate.

He was married to Dr.Sudha Kallianpurkar from Dharwad and has two sons and a daughter.

He died on 1 December 1985 in Hubli, Karnataka.

Awards
He received the Sangeet Natak Akademi Award in 1962, the Karnataka Sangeet-Nritya Akademi Award in 1971 and the Uttra Pradesh Sangeet Natak Akademi Award in 1981.

References

Kathak exponents
1913 births
1985 deaths
Artists from Karnataka
Indian classical choreographers
Performers of Indian classical dance
Teachers of Indian classical dance
Recipients of the Sangeet Natak Akademi Award
Dancers from Karnataka
20th-century Indian dancers